is a superhero and kaiju film released in Japan on September 16, 2006, serving as a threatical tie-in to the Ultraman Mebius series. It is the 10th original film in the Ultraman franchise, and celebrates the 40th anniversary of the franchise. The film peaked at 3rd in the Japanese box offices.

Plot 

The film begins 20 years ago, on the moon, with four of the Ultra brothers, Ultraman, Ultraseven, Ultraman Jack, and Ultraman Ace locked in battle with the Ultimate Terrible-Monster, U-Killersaurus, created and controlled by Yapool. They manage to injure and weaken the beast and send it falling to the Earth, where it crashes and sinks in the sea of Kobe. As the Ultra Brothers approach the area, Yapool manifests before them in an astral form and vows that he and U-Killersaurus will recover and rise again. The Ultra brothers decide to seal Yapool and U-Killersaurus in the ocean, but this action depletes their energy and renders them unable to transform. Stranded on their human hosts and forms, the Ultra brothers take jobs to be in the area of Kobe should Yapool ever return.

20 years later, Mirai Hibino and crew GUYS are sent to Kobe as part of an investigation. There, he meets and befriends Aya Jinguji, an oceanographer who is also part of GUYS, as well as her skittish little brother, Takato. Aya explains to Mirai that, three months ago, Takato and his pet dog Art were attacked by the monster Kelbim, which resulted in Art getting injured by the creature. The incident traumatized Takato and made him resentful toward GUYS and the Ultramen. Mirai bonds with Takato and works to restore the boy's faith on the Ultramen. While on Kobe, he also encounters the human identities of the Ultra brothers, who give him advice. They witness an Ultra Sign sent by Zoffy warning them of a new threat known as the Alien Union, a quartet of aliens made of Alien Zarab, Alien Guts, Alien Nackle and Alien Temperor, who are working to release Yapool and U-Killersaurus from their prison. Alien Temperor is the first to attack, but is easily defeated and destroyed by Ultraman Mebius. However, his battle gives the other three aliens insight on how to take Mebius down.

Alien Zarab then proceeds to enact the next part of the plan. He kidnaps Aya and assumes her form to poison Mirai with a phony drink. As Mirai struggles, Zarab disguises himself as Ultraman Mebius and rampages across Kobe, much to Takato's shock. Mirai manages to regain his strength and transforms into Mebius. He confronts Zarab, exposes him as an impostor and destroys him before giving Takato a peace sign, but is still too weakened and is captured in a crystal cross by Alien Guts. With Mebius imprisoned, the other Ultra Brothers decide to transform to help him despite their low energy. They battle Guts and Nackle and seemingly beat them before freeing Mebius. However, Guts and Nackle rise again and reveal they wanted to lure the Ultra Brothers in order to catch them. The two aliens imprison the Ultra Brothers in crystal crosses and proceed to syphon their energy to revitalize Yapool before tossing Mebius away, who turns back into Mirai.

Weakened, Mirai comes across Takato, and, regaining his courage, transforms into Mebius before the boy's eyes. He confronts Guts and Nackle once again, destroying the former and releasing the Ultra Brothers from their crosses. However, it is too late, and Yapool and U-Killersaurus are successfully released from their prison. As Alien Nackle boasts about his triumph, he is abruptly killed by U-Killersaurus, and Yapool reveals the Alien Union were nothing but pawns he manipulated to release him. U-Killersaurus then rises from the ground in a towering, gargantuan form called U-Killersaurus Neo, and a battle between it and the Ultramen ensues. As the Ultra Brothers and Mebius struggle to fight the beast, Commander Zoffy and Ultraman Taro descend from the sky, restore the energy of their comrades and join them in the fray. As Mebius tries to shoot a beam at U-Killersaurus Neo, he notices the creature is keeping an unconscious Aya imprisoned within the crystal on its forehead. After revealing this, the other Ultramen fuse with Mebius, turning him into Mebius Infinity who quickly manages to save Aya and destroy U-Killersaurus in the process. Heavily weakened, Yapool vanishes into nothingness.

With U-Killersaurus and Yapool destroyed and the city saved, Mirai prepares to return to the Phoenix Nest base. Takato, with his faith restored, vows to become a member of GUYS when he grows up, while Aya grows suspicious of Mirai's true identity and suggests they should see each other again. Mirai says goodbye to them both and goes back to the base with the rest of the crew, while the Ultra Brothers fly back to the Land of Light.

Cast 
 : 
 : 
 : 
 : 
 : 
 : 
 : 
 : 
 : 
 : 
 : 
 : 
 : 
 : 
 : 
 : 
 : 
  of America Zarigani
  of America Zarigani
 
 
 
 
 
 : 
 : 
 : 
 : 
 : 
 : 
 :

Suit actors 
 Ultraman Mebius: 
 Ultraman: 
 Ultra Seven: 
 Ultraman Jack: 
 Ultraman Ace: 
 Ultraman Taro: 
 Zoffy: 
 The Imit-Ultraman Mebius: 

Music 
Ending Theme
  by KIYOSHI
 "" is read with a title "", but it is read in words "".

Insert Theme
  by KIYOSHI

Reception

Ultraman Mebius & Ultraman Brothers earned $3,612,844 at the Japanese box office.

References

External links 
 Tsuburaya Productions - The Official Home of Ultraman (Japanese)
 Official Website of Ultraman Mebius & Ultra Brothers (Japanese)
 Ultra 40th on FLET'S (Japanese) 
 Ultraman Mebius & Ultra Brothers Review

Films directed by Kazuya Konaka
Films set in 1986
Films set in 2006
2006 films
Ultra Series films
Crossover tokusatsu films
Films set in Kobe
Films scored by Toshihiko Sahashi
2000s Japanese films